Glenhaven is a suburb of Sydney, in the state of New South Wales, Australia 32 kilometres west of the Sydney central business district in the local government areas of The Hills Shire and Hornsby Shire, part of the Hills District region.

History
The area was originally called Sandhurst, which remains Glenhaven's most prominent street. Crego Rd, which runs off Sandhurst is the highest. There was some confusion with mail because of a suburb in Melbourne with the same name. A public meeting was held to have the name changed to reflect its valley location. The upper portion of the valley was known as "The Glen", and the lower portion as "The Haven", hence the choice Glenhaven.

Glenhaven is on the route of the Great North Road that linked Parramatta with the Hunter Valley. John Evans, one of the first settlers in the area, used a bullock team to drag timber, and the route he used became known as Evans Road. The area had many wild flowers, including waratahs, Christmas bush, boronias, native roses, and a variety of orchids which thrived there.

Sandhurst Post Office opened on 11 July 1892 and was renamed Glenhaven on 1 January 1893. It closed in 1972.

Schools
Glenhaven has two schools:
Glenhaven Public School 
Samuel Gilbert Public School

Transport
 Route 603 from Rouse Hill Town Centre to Parramatta via Castle Hill and vice versa services most of the suburb.
 The 637 and 638 service to Castle Hill services the eastern portion of the suburb.
 The 652X service to the Sydney CBD via West Pennant Hills and the M2 runs during peak hour. 

Housing
Glenhaven is a leafy suburb with large homes on large blocks of land. On the east side of Old Northern Road semi-rural acreages are present, as well as a retirement village and the Flower Power Garden Centre. Since half the suburb is located on a ridge 180-200m high, the higher terrain homes have picturesque panoramas of the Blue Mountains looking out to the west.

Population

Demographics
According to the 2016 census, the suburb of Glenhaven had a population of 6,501 people. Of these:

 Sex distribution: 48.5% were male and 51.5% were female.
 Age distribution: The median age was 45 years, compared to the national median of 38 years. 
 Ethnic diversity: 73.4% of people were born in Australia. The next most common countries of birth were England 5.1%, New Zealand 1.7% and South Africa 1.7%.  84.2% of people spoke only English at home.
 Religion: The most common responses for religion were Catholic 30.0%, Anglican 23.6% and No Religion 19.3%.
 Finances: The median household weekly income was $2,259, compared to the national median of $1,438. The median mortgage payment in Glenhaven is $2,685	 per month, compared to the national median of $1,755.

Notable residents
 John Marks, former Australian tennis player
 Delta Goodrem, singer and actress
 Dieter Brummer, actor
 Brian Houston, pastor
 Nathan Hindmarsh, rugby league player
 Greg Page, original Yellow member of The Wiggles
 Jordan Hall, Mr Australia 2019

Glenhaven Rural Fire brigade 
Glenhaven Rural Fire Brigade is a volunteer fire brigade with the NSW Rural Fire Service. It currently has approximately 50 members. The brigade has a Category 1 tankers, a Category 7 tanker and a Personal Carrier.

References

Suburbs of Sydney
The Hills Shire
Hornsby Shire